TRNSMT (pronounced as "Transmit") is a music festival staged at Glasgow Green in Glasgow, Scotland, organised by DF Concerts.

History
An early line-up for the first TRNSMT festival was revealed in January 2017, two months after the announcement that T in the Park (also organised by DF Concerts) would not be staged that year. The first festival took place over three days in July 2017 and the organisers said that 120,000 people attended.

Shortly after the first festival concluded, a second event was announced for the following year. In November 2017, the festival organisers announced a change of date. The 2018 event was held over six days, split over two weekends. In 2019 the event returned to being three days covering a single weekend, with a daily capacity of 50,000.

On 24 April 2020, it was announced that the 2020 festival would not go ahead due to the COVID-19 pandemic.

Awards
TRNSMT was named 'best new festival' in December 2017 at the UK Festival Awards in London.

Criticism
The Musicians' Union criticized the 2019 lineup for only 20% of the acts being female. In response the festival announced they would have a female-only 'Queen Tut's' stage. When the first acts were announced for the 2020 festival the head of DF Concerts, Geoff Ellis, defended the lack of female acts announced, saying "we'd love there to be a higher representation of females but there isn't, certainly on the acts we're announcing today, it will be a while until there's a 50/50 balance" and "we need to get more females picking up guitars, forming bands, playing in bands”.

Headliners
For full lineups see TRNSMT festival line-ups

 2017 – Radiohead, Kasabian, Biffy Clyro
 2018 – Stereophonics, Liam Gallagher, Arctic Monkeys, Queen + Adam Lambert, The Killers
2019 – Stormzy, Catfish and the Bottlemen, George Ezra 
2021 – Courteeners, Liam Gallagher, The Chemical Brothers
2022 – Paolo Nutini, The Strokes. Lewis Capaldi
2023 – Pulp, Sam Fender, The 1975

References

External links

 

Music festivals in Scotland
Music festivals established in 2017
Festivals in Glasgow
Annual events in Glasgow
2017 establishments in Scotland
Glasgow Green
Summer events in Scotland